Vognsild is a village in western Himmerland with a population of 240 (1 January 2022), located six kilometers east of Farsø and nine kilometers west of Aars. The nearest village is Østrup four kilometers east of Vognsild.
The village is located in the North Denmark Region and belongs to Vesthimmerland Municipality. The village has a church and a club house. Vognsild also has a sports and ball club.

References

Towns and settlements in Vesthimmerland Municipality